The Southern Extreme Bull Riding Association (SEBRA) is an American regional semi-professional rodeo association.

History
SEBRA was founded in Archdale, North Carolina in 1994 by Jerome Davis, a co-founder of the Professional Bull Riders (PBR). Its headquarters are still in Archdale. His intent with SEBRA was to establish a bull riding association to help young athletes get started in the sport.

With the strong growth of the PBR, Davis soon stepped down from SEBRA.  He was succeeded as president by Chan Canter.  Within five years, SEBRA had grown from sanctioning 150 events per year to more than 400 events across the United States.

SEBRA runs and promotes schools and clinics to help bull riders advance to professional event. SEBRA also helps its producers develop stronger shows with higher attendance and a higher caliber of bull riders. PBR riders such as J.B. Mauney, Brian Canter, Billy Robinson, and Josh Faircloth all started in SEBRA events.

SEBRA also works on increasing its fan base. SEBRA's smallest venues can accommodate 800 fans while other performances can attract crowds of 5,000 people a night. Thousands of fans now follow SEBRA bull riders and events through the SEBRA website and social media. SEBRA provides its bull riders more than $500,000 in cash payouts from their regular events each year. Each year, the top 40 SEBRA bull riders are invited to the SEBRA National Finals to compete for more than $60,000 in cash and awards. SEBRA also sanctions barrel racing at their bull riding events. SEBRA also used to sanction bareback bronc and saddle bronc riding at some of their events.

Season Champions

Bull Riding 

Source:

Barrel Racing 

Source:

Saddle Bronc Riding 

Source:

Bareback Bronc Riding 

Source:

References

External links
 OfficialSite

Rodeo organizations
Sports in North Carolina
Randolph County, North Carolina
Rodeo competition series
Rodeo in the United States
Organizations established in 1994